Kartik Shetty (also known as Prajval Shetty)  is a Mumbai-based Indian actor and director. He has acted in the Kannada films Yuva and Karthik. He directed the Marathi film Bhakti Heech Khari Shakti and Than Than Gopal

Personal life
Kartik Shetty was born in Mumbai on 4 July 1987. His father, Vijay B. Shetty, is from Udupi. His mother, Sulatha V. Shetty is from Karkala. He did his early education from DonBosco school Matunga Mumbai and Jai Hind college, Digital Academy-The Film school Mumbai. He learned mixed martial arts and Mua Thai in Singapore.  He is also a polo player.

Career
Kartik Shetty made his directorial debut in the Marathi film Bhakti Heech Khari Shakti in 2006 and began his acting career in the Kannada film Yuva in 2009,  the Kannada film Karthik in 2011 and the Kannada film Agni Musti  in 2012.
At the age of 19 years, he became the first Mumbai-Kannadiga to venture into Marathi film production.

Filmography

References

Indian male film actors
Film directors from Mumbai
Male actors in Kannada cinema
Marathi film directors
1987 births
Living people
Male actors from Mumbai